Styloctetor is a genus of sheet weavers that was first described by Eugène Louis Simon in 1884.

Species
 it contains eight species, found in Asia and North Africa:
Styloctetor austerus (L. Koch, 1884) – Switzerland, Austria
Styloctetor compar (Westring, 1861) – USA (Alaska), Canada, Europe, Russia (European to Far East)
Styloctetor lehtineni Marusik & Tanasevitch, 1998 – Russia
Styloctetor logunovi (Eskov & Marusik, 1994) – Russia, Kazakhstan, Mongolia
Styloctetor okhotensis (Eskov, 1993) – Russia
Styloctetor purpurescens (Keyserling, 1886) – USA, Canada
Styloctetor romanus (O. Pickard-Cambridge, 1873) (type) – Europe, North Africa, Turkey, Caucasus, Russia (Europe to Far East), Central Asia, China
Styloctetor tuvinensis Marusik & Tanasevitch, 1998 – Russia

See also
 List of Linyphiidae species (Q–Z)

References

Araneomorphae genera
Linyphiidae
Spiders of Asia
Spiders of North America